Leptotragulus is an extinct genus of protoceratid, endemic to North America.

Leptotragulus resembled deer. However, they were more closely related to camelids. In addition to having horns in the more usual place, protoceratids had additional, rostral horns above the orbital cavity.

Fossil distribution
Fossils have been recovered from: 
Goshen Hole Formation, Goshen County, Wyoming 
Wiggins Formation, Fremont County, Wyoming

References 

 
Priabonian genus extinctions
Eocene even-toed ungulates
Prehistoric mammals of North America
Taxa named by Henry Fairfield Osborn
Fossil taxa described in 1887
Prehistoric even-toed ungulate genera